Eddie Lee Brown (born December 18, 1962) is an American former professional football player who was a wide receiver in the National Football League (NFL) for the Cincinnati Bengals from 1985–1991. He played college football at the University of Miami.

College career
Brown was part of the 1983 Miami Hurricanes football team that upset the University of Nebraska in the 1984 Orange Bowl to earn Miami's first National Championship. The following year, Brown was a consensus first-team All-American and was the first wide receiver in UM history to amass over 1,000 yards receiving, with 220 of those yards (on 10 catches) coming in the famous "Hail Flutie" shootout with Boston College. Brown would leave Miami with school career records for receptions, receiving yards and receiving touchdowns.

Professional career
In the 1985 NFL Draft, Brown was the second receiver selected (after Al Toon) and the 13th pick overall by the Cincinnati Bengals, three picks ahead of Jerry Rice. In 1985 he won the NFL Rookie of the Year Award with 53 receptions for 942 yards and eight touchdowns.

In 1988, Brown caught 53 passes for 1,273 yards and nine touchdowns, topping the high-powered Bengals offense in yards and leading the Bengals to the 1988 AFC Championship and Super Bowl XXIII. The season earned Brown his only trip to the Pro Bowl. His 1,273 receiving yards was a franchise record, and his 24 yards per catch average is an NFL single-season record that still stands for receivers with 50+ receptions.

Brown's team record for receiving yards was later surpassed by Chad Johnson's 1,355 yards in 2003, but it took Johnson 37 more receptions than Brown (90) to reach this mark. Brown also set a franchise record for most receiving yards in a single game (216) in the 1988 season, which stood until surpassed by Johnson's 260 receiving yards in a game during the 2006 season.

Brown's final NFL season was in 1991. He finished his seven-year NFL career with 363 catches (seventh in Bengals history) for 6,134 yards (fifth) and 41 touchdowns (fourth), along with 164 rushing yards.

References

External links
 Brown's stats
 More Career Stats

1962 births
Living people
All-American college football players
American Conference Pro Bowl players
American football wide receivers
Cincinnati Bengals players
Miami Hurricanes football players
National Football League Offensive Rookie of the Year Award winners
Navarro Bulldogs football players
Players of American football from Miami
Miami Senior High School alumni